A leadership election for the Mayors and Independents (STAN) in 2017 was held on 25 March 2017. The incumbent leader Petr Gazdík was the only candidate. Gazdík received 135 of 145 votes and was elected for another term.

References

Mayors and Independents leadership elections
2017 elections in the Czech Republic
Indirect elections
Mayors and Independents leadership election